Guzaarish means request in Urdu language.

Guzaarish could also refer to:
‘Request’
 Guzaarish (film), a 2010 Indian Bollywood film
 Guzaarish (TV series), a 2015 Pakistani television drama series